Robert II de Ferrers, 2nd Earl of Derby (c. 1100 – 1162) was a younger, but eldest surviving son of Robert de Ferrers, 1st Earl of Derby and his wife Hawise. He succeeded his father as Earl of Derby in 1139 (William, his elder brother, having been murdered in London sometime before). He was head of a family which controlled a large part of Derbyshire including an area later known as Duffield Frith.

Life 
Little is known of Robert's life, other than his generosity to the church. In 1148, he established Merevale Abbey in Warwickshire, England, where he requested to be buried in an ox hide.

He founded the Priory of Derby, which later moved to Darley Abbey, and its  Abbot was granted many privileges in Duffield Forest and Chase.

He continued his father's attempts to play a role in the civil war commonly called The Anarchy that arose because of the contesting claims of Empress Matilda and Stephen of England. The family's support for Stephen led to him being awarded the revenues of the Borough of Derby in 1139, though in 1149 Stephen then granted the Borough to the Earl of Chester

He finally threw in his lot with the future Henry II after Tutbury Castle was besieged in 1153. However, when Henry came to the throne in 1154, he withdrew de Ferrers' right to use the title of Earl or to receive the "third penny" on the profits of the county.

Family and death

Around 1135, he married Margaret Peverell, and had at least one son and one daughter.

He died in 1162 and was succeeded by his son William de Ferrers, 3rd Earl of Derby. The stone effigies of Robert and his wife, Margaret Peverel, lie in the gatehouse chapel of Merevale Abbey, near the village of Atherstone.
CORRECTION-I DON'T KNOW WHO THESE STONE EFFIGIES BELONG TO BUT THEY ARE NOT OF ROBERT FERRERS. ONLY WILLIAM FERRERS 5TH EARL OF DERBY WAS BURIED IN THE GATEHOUSE CHAPEL OF MEREVALE.

References

1162 deaths
Anglo-Normans
People from Staffordshire
People from Derbyshire
Burials in Warwickshire
Year of birth unknown
2
Year of birth uncertain